Xiaoqing or Qingqing is a mythological figure in Chinese folk religion. She is one of the protagonists of the Legend of the White Snake, one of China's "four great folktales".

Legends
Xiaoqing is a green snake who transforms into a human being after five hundred years of disciplined training in Taoism. Xiaoqing is the close confidant or sworn sister of the protagonist Bai Suzhen, the white snake. Bai Suzhen often calls her Qingmei or Qing'er. 

After Fahai pushed Bai Suzhen down under the Leifeng Pagoda, Xiaoqing was no match for Fahai, and had no choice but to retreat to Mount Emei, go back into the cave and return to practicing Daoist austerities. Twelve years later, she had finally completed the True Fire of Samadhi, and came to find Fahai for revenge. There was nowhere for Fahai to escape being burned by the True Fire of Samadhi, so in a great rush, he hid inside a crab shell. Leifang Pagoda collapsed, and Bai Suzhen was saved. From then on, she and Bai Suzhen, Xu Xian and their child all lived a blessed and happy life together.

Xiaoqing's fate varies depending on the preference of the storyteller. In some versions, Xiaoqing and Bai Suzhen are fused together in the Leifeng Pagoda; in others, Xiaoqing marries Xu Xian (or a friend of his) and has a son, Xu Rulin. Sometimes it is said she never married, instead devoting herself to neidan, and in an even more extreme variation, she is portrayed as a treacherous antagonist who betrays Bai Suzhen. However, in almost all versions, Xiaoqing finally becomes a deity.

The popular film Green Snake features Xiaoqing as the main character. It is an adaptation of the novel of the same name by Lilian Lee, published in 1993.

Influence

Gallery

See also
Legend of the White Snake
Green Snake

References 

Legend of the White Snake characters
Fictional therianthropes
Legendary serpents
Shapeshifting
Chinese operas
Female legendary creatures
Hangzhou in fiction
Love stories
Buddhist folklore
Chinese legends